Galion City School District is a public school district (number 1705) serving students in the city of Galion, Ohio, United States. The school district enrolls 2,193 students as of the 2008–2009 academic year.

Schools

Elementary schools
Dawsett Elementary School (Grades K through 3rd) (Demolished in 2008)
North Elementary School (Grades K through 3rd) (Demolished in 2008)
Renschville Elementary School (Grades 4th and 5th) (Demolished in 2008)
Galion Primary School (Grades Pre-K through 2nd)
Galion Intermediate School (Grades 3rd through 5th)

Middle schools
Galion Middle School (Grades 6th through 8th)

High schools
Galion High School (Grades 9th through 13th)

References

External links
Galion City School District website

School districts in Ohio
Education in Crawford County, Ohio